Pathra also known as Pathara is a village in Parbhani taluka of Parbhani district of Maharashtra state in India.

Demography
According to the 2011 census of India, Pathra had a population of 1324, of which 677 were male and 448 were female. The average sex ratio of the village was 957, which was higher than the Maharashtra state average of 929. The literacy rate was 71.69% compared to 82.3% for the state. Male literacy rate was 82% while female literacy rate was 60%.

Geography and Transport
Following table shows distance of Pathra from some of major cities.

References

Villages in Parbhani district